The 2021 Thurrock Council election took place on 6 May 2021 to elect members of Thurrock Council in England. This was on the same day as other local elections. The previous election in the area was in 2019 and the next was in 2022.

The Conservatives won the popular vote by over 50% of total vote share, and took three seats the party had never won previously - Chadwell St Mary, Belhus and East Tilbury.

The overall turnout for the election was 27.34%.

Results

Wards

Aveley & Uplands

Belhus

Chadwell St. Mary

Chafford & North Stifford

Corringham & Fobbing

East Tilbury

Grays Riverside

Grays Thurrock

Little Thurrock Blackshots

Ockendon

Orsett

South Chafford

Stanford East & Corringham Town

Stanford-le-Hope West

The Homesteads

Tilbury St. Chads

West Thurrock & South Stifford

References

Thurrock
Thurrock Council elections